Pedro Manuel Grácio Lagoa (born 21 August 1997) is a Portuguese professional footballer who plays as a midfielder for Mérida in the Spanish Segunda División RFEF.

Football career
On 23 July 2017, Lagoa made his professional debut with Académica de Coimbra in a 2017–18 Taça da Liga match against Arouca. He joined Bulgarian club Etar Veliko Tarnovo in February 2020, signing a contract until the summer of 2021.

References

External links

1997 births
Living people
Portuguese footballers
Association football midfielders
Associação Académica de Coimbra – O.A.F. players
Anadia F.C. players
SFC Etar Veliko Tarnovo players
FC Botev Vratsa players
Liga Portugal 2 players
First Professional Football League (Bulgaria) players
Expatriate footballers in Bulgaria
Sportspeople from Coimbra